Samuel Spencer Baldwin (January 21, 1848 – March 13, 1924), or Samri Baldwin, most well known as "The White Mahatma" was an American magician.

Biography

Baldwin was born in Cincinnati, Ohio. He became interested in magic whilst watching the Davenport brothers perform séances. He began to duplicate the tricks of fraudulent mediums such as Anna Eva Fay. He was the first to take the "question and answer" mentalism act to the stage. 

Baldwin exposed the tricks of fraudulent mediums and claimed to have learned the tricks of the fakirs of India. He was married to the stage mentalist Kitty (1853-1934) would assist him in his performances, they had one daughter Shadow.

The magician Fulton Oursler when writing on the subject of magic and spiritualism, used the name Samri Frikell. He made it by combining the names of Samri Baldwin and another magician, Wiljalba Frikell.

Baldwin was one of the first magicians to have practiced a stage escape from handcuffs. He had performed this feat as early as 1871. Early in his career the magician Harry Houdini demonstrated a handcuff escape at the Alhambra Theatre. The manager C. Dundas Slater noted that Baldwin had performed the trick many years before Houdini.

Magician Joseph Rinn noted that Baldwin in his day was believed to possess psychic powers but this view was erroneous because "he never pretended to be anything but an entertainer."

Baldwin died at his home in San Francisco on March 13, 1924.

Publications 
The Secrets of Mahatma Land Explained (1895)
Spirit Mediums Exposed (1879)

Quotes

References

Further reading
Bruce Macnab. (2012). Houdini Meets the White Mahatma. In The Metamorphosis: The Apprenticeship of Harry Houdini. Goose Lane Editions. 

Samri S. Baldwin (1895) Secrets of Mahatma Land Explained   http://www.iapsop.com/ssoc/1895__baldwin___secrets_of_mahatma_land_explained.pdf

External links
Civil War Era Magicians
Houdini And Samri Baldwin
Baldwin, The Mahatma

1848 births
1924 deaths
American magicians
American skeptics
Harry Houdini
Mentalists
People from Cincinnati